Natalia Yurievna Ragozina (born 5 April 1976), better known as Natascha Ragosina, is an undefeated retired Russian professional boxer who spent much of her career ranked as the top female super middleweight in the world.

Career
Though born in Kazakhstan (formerly a part of the Soviet Union) and currently residing in Moscow, she competed professionally for Russia and is of Russian descent. She is the longest reigning WBA female super middleweight champion and WBC female super middleweight champion. At the time of her retirement, she held all major female super middleweight titles and two heavyweight belts:
IWBF (International Women's Boxing Federation) super middleweight title
WIBF (Women's International Boxing Federation) super middleweight title
WIBA (Women's International Boxing Association) super middleweight title
Global Boxing Union Female super middleweight title
WBC female super middleweight title
WBA female super middleweight title
WIBC super middleweight title
WIBF (Women's International Boxing Federation) heavyweight title
WBF (Women's Boxing Federation) heavyweight title

On 15 March 2008, Ragosina defeated Bermudian Teresa Perozzi to win a record 7 championship belts in a single fight, breaking Giselle Salandy's previous record of 6 belts won in a single fight. However, two weeks later, Salandy - a light middleweight boxer - defeated Karolina Lukasik in a match with 8 titles on the line to regain her record for titles won in a single fight.

On 11 July 2008, Ragosina won a controversial decision against Conjestina Achieng, winning a close but unanimous decision. One judge awarded Ragosina the fight by a single round, and the other two judges had Ragosina winning by a two-round margin. Some boxing observers believe Achieng won the fight. Perhaps due to the controversial decision in the first fight, the two had a rematch on 28 November 2008, which Ragosina won more convincingly.

On 19 December 2009, Ragosina defeated heavyweight world champion Pamela London by knockout to add two heavyweight championships to her resume - the WIBF Women's International Boxing Federation heavyweight title and the World Boxing Federation heavyweight title. This brought Ragosina's record to 22-0, including a 16-0 record in title fights.

Ragosina is also a single mother. She considers herself good friends with fighters Fedor Emelianenko, Alexander Povetkin, and Nikolai Valuev.

Titles

Boxing
2009 WBF heavyweight world champion
2009 W.I.B.F. heavyweight world champion
2008 I.W.B.F. super middleweight world champion
2007–09 W.B.C. super middleweight world champion (4 title defences)
2007–08 W.I.B.A. super middleweight world champion (2 title defences)
2007–09 W.B.A. super middleweight world champion (6 title defences)
2006–09 Global Boxing Union (GBU). super middleweight world champion (7 title defences)
2005–09 W.I.B.F. super middleweight world champion (10 title defences)
2004–05 W.I.B.F. super middleweight Inter-Continental champion (1 title defence)

Kickboxing
1999 W.A.K.O. World Championships in Caorle, Italy  +70 kg (Full-Contact)
1998 W.A.K.O. European Championships in Leverkusen, Germany  +65 kg (Full-Contact)
1996 W.A.K.O. European Championships in Belgrade, Serbia & Montenegro  +65 kg (Full-Contact)

Professional boxing record

Additional notes
Official Website
List of WBC female world champions
List of WBA female world champions
World Boxing Council
List of female boxers

References

1976 births
Living people
Sportspeople from Karaganda
Sportspeople from Moscow
World boxing champions
Russian women boxers
Russian female kickboxers
Super-middleweight boxers